Deborah Carlos-Valencia (born ) sometimes written as Deborah Valencia) is a Filipino social worker, feminist, founder of the Kasapi Union, and co-founder of the Melissa Network, an organization that brings together leaders of the established migrant community in Greece.

Personal life 
Carlos-Valencia is a Filipino feminist and community leader who fled the Philippines to Greece during the Marco dictatorship in 1985. Her husband Joe and son followed her to Greece some years later. She was aged 70 in 2019.

Life in Philippines 
A trade-unionist and a social worker, Carlos-Valencia had to flee the Philippines after she and her husband became involved in Workers' resistance against the Marcos dictatorship.

Life in Greece 

After arrival in Greece, Carlos-Valencia co-founded the Melissa Network in Athens in 2014 with Nadina Christopoulo. The organization serves the needs of migrant women in Greece, especially migrant domestic workers in Athens. The organization has since grown to include women from 45 countries. The organization is a based in Victoria Square in central Athens, amidst a community where far-right anti-migrant sentiment is high. Services provided include language lessons and other life skills.

In 1986, Carlos-Valencia helped found the Kasapi Union, an organisation supporting solidarity for those affected by Filipion dictator Ferdinand Marcos. In 1998, she organized a worker's solidarity event at Panteion University.

She is also helped found the DIWATA – The Philippine Women’s Network in Greece microcredit cooperative and was a founding member of BABAYLAN-Philippine Women’s Network in Europe.

Six years after her arrival in Greece, in 2020, Carlos-Valencia was one of the 2.9% of Filipinos to obtain Greek citizenship.

References

External links 
 Melissa Network official website

Filipino feminists
Filipino emigrants to Greece
Filipino women's rights activists
Women founders
Organization founders
Filipino founders
People from Athens
Social workers
1940s births
Filipino refugees
Refugees in Greece
Greek trade unionists
Filipino trade unionists
Filipino trade union leaders
Living people